Abul Khayer Jashim Uddin (known professionally as Jashim; 14 August 1950 – 8 October 1998) was a Bangladeshi film actor, producer, action director and a freedom fighter. He acted in more than 200 films and is known as the first action hero of Dhallywood.

Early life and career
Jashim was born at Boxnagar village in Nawabganj Upazila, Dhaka on 14 August 1950. He was a freedom fighter who fought in the Liberation War of Bangladesh in 1971  at  sector  2 under Major ATM Haider.

Jashim debuted his acting career through the film Debor in 1972. He then acted in Rongbaj (1973). He went to act  in Raj Dulari, Tufan, Jobab, Nag Nagini, Bodla, Barud, Sundori, Koshai, Lalu Mastan, Nababjada and Meyerao Manush. He debuted as a lead actor in the film Shobuj Shathi, directed by Delowar Jahan Jhontu. He went on to act in the films Poribar, Buker Dhon, Shami Keno Ashami, Lal Golap, Tiger and Habildar.

Personal life
Jashim's first wife was film actress Sucharita and later he married Nasrin, the daughter of actress Purnima Sengupta. Ratul, Rahul and Samee are the sons of Jashim.

Death
Jashim died from a brain haemorrhage on 8 October 1998.

Filmography

References

External links

1950 births
1998 deaths
People from Dhaka
Bangladeshi male film actors